The Hesselman engine is a hybrid between a petrol engine and a Diesel engine. It was designed and  introduced  in 1925 by Swedish engineer Jonas Hesselman (1877-1957). It represented the first use of direct gasoline injection on a spark-ignition engine used to power a road going vehicle. Hesselman engines saw use in heavy trucks and buses in models produced in the 1920s and 1930s.

Operation 
The Hesselman engine incorporates a combustion process with regular intake air compression.  The fuel is direct-injected into the combustion chamber at the very end of the compression stroke, near top dead centre (TDC). Due to low compression, the inhomogeneous air-fuel mixture must be ignited by a spark plug. Under full load, Hesselman engine uses quality torque controlling without throttling, whilst under medium load and when idling, a throttle valve ensures a stable engine speed. Injection duration can be manipulated to adapt to the engine load, with the injection end point remaining always the same. The valves are shaped in a way that they generate a swirl that helps mixing air and fuel.  Hesselman engine is a multifuel engine, capable of running on petroleum products such as oil, kerosene, petrol or diesel oil. Although a mixture of features of both Otto cycle and Diesel cycle, the Hesselman engine is more closely related to the Otto engine.

Advantages and disadvantages 

Hesselman engines could use heavier oils which were considerably cheaper than gasoline and were therefore more economical to operate for the vehicle owner. Contemporary tests also pointed to a slightly lower fuel consumption in comparison to gasoline engines of similar power.

A Hesselman engine compared to a diesel engine had smaller dimensions and hence lower weight. In the 1930s knowledge of metallurgy was less advanced, therefore diesel engines were heavy to cope with the high compression and pressure during combustion. Later, diesel engines were developed with better materials and Hesselman engines lost this advantage. 

Hesselman engines had several disadvantages. Due to the low compression it was difficult to reach the working temperature. The result was an incomplete combustion. The incomplete combustion led to the spark plugs quickly fouling, and this incomplete combustion also resulted in copious unburned fuel in the exhaust, otherwise known as "heavy smoke". In today's terms, this meant that the engines generated toxic exhausts on a scale that would be considered completely unacceptable.

Users 

Hesselman engines were produced by all three Swedish truck manufacturers of its day, Scania-Vabis, Tidaholms Bruk and Volvo, from the late 1920s. Scania-Vabis replaced Hesselman engines with proper Diesel engines from 1936, and Volvo from 1947.

See also 
Hulsebos-Hesselman axial oil engines
Gasoline direct injection
Diesel engine

Bibliography 
  (Translated title: Vehicle history of Scania 1891-1991)
  (Translated title: Volvo trucks yesterday and today)
Lundeberg, Erik (1931)  Hesselmanmotorn som bilmotor (Stockholm: Dædalus)
George James Wells, Alexander James Wallis-Tayler (1924) The Diesel Engine: A Practical Treatise on the Design and Construction of the Diesel Engine (London: C. Lockwood and son)

References

External links
 Hesselman Heavy-Oil High-Compression Engine N.A.C.A. Technical Memorandum

Internal combustion piston engines
Swedish inventions